William Wailes (1808–1881) was the proprietor of one of England's largest and most prolific stained glass workshops.

Life and career
Wailes was born and grew up in Newcastle on Tyne, England's centre of domestic glass and bottle manufacturing. His first business was as a grocer and tea merchant. However, his artistic talent and practical skills led him to set up a small kiln in the backyard of his premises. He made and fired small decorative enamels which were sold in his shop.

In 1830 he went to Germany to study stained glass design and production under Mayer of Munich. In 1838 he set up his own stained glass studio to design and manufacture windows and in 1841 the business began producing its own glass. 

In 1842 the architect Augustus Pugin approached Wailes about producing windows for him. Working with Pugin was a thankless task, as Pugin went from one workshop to another in an attempt to get his designs realised at the lowest possible cost. The working relationship lasted for only three years.

Regardless of this, Wailes made a name for himself through the provision of windows for local churches. As his enterprise prospered, he employed more men until there were 76 employees, who included in their number several designers who were to go on to establish their own factories. These included Francis Wilson Oliphant R.A. (1818–1859) and George Joseph Baguley (1834–1915). William Wailes was one of the twenty-five stained glass manufacturers that exhibited in the Crystal Palace Exhibition in 1851.

Wailes married (Elizabeth) and they had several children, including a son, William Thomas Wailes, who was to join his father in the business, as did his son-in-law, Thomas Rankine Strang, in 1861, when the firm became known as Wailes and Strang.

In 1860 Wailes bought the Saltwell Estate at Gateshead and set about improving it, building himself a decorative mansion and landscaping the grounds. Unfortunately, he ran into debt and 16 years later sold the property to the Gateshead Corporation. The estate became a public park known as Saltwell Park which includes the house, Saltwell Towers. However Wailes continued to reside in his home until his death in 1881. William Thomas Wailes continued to manufacture stained glass until 1910.

Artistic recognition
Wailes was painted, next to a window exemplifying his work, by John Oliphant. The painting hangs in the Shipley Art Gallery in Gateshead.

Stained glass

Style
Although William Wailes employed a number of designers, the products of his workshop are often identifiable by type of glass and the particular colour combinations that prevailed. Wailes’ glass is often a little paler and more brightly coloured than many English workshops of the same date, being rather more like glass from Germany or Limoges. There are certain distinctive colour combinations that occur repeatedly in the clothing of figures in Wailes’ windows- mauve lined with bright red, yellow lined with bright blue, red lined with acid green. Many of Wailes window contain a great deal of pink glass.

Although Wailes was seen as a Gothic Revival artist, and was able to fill windows with ornate foliate patterns that have the quality of brightly painted manuscripts rather than ancient glass, his figures were elegantly classicising and decidedly staid of demeanour. Figures in Wailes’ windows communicate in a series of stereotypical hand gestures. Moreover, the details of faces are applied in a painterly manner, as against the almost calligraphic manner with which some of the 19th-century artists such as John Hardman imitated ancient windows. The painterly manner is typical of that employed by Mayer of Munich, with whom Wailes trained.

Gloucester Cathedral
While most of the work of Wailes' workshop is to be found in the North of England, other commissions came from further afield. The most significant window glazed by the firm, and one of the prize commissions of the industry, was the glazing of the west window of Gloucester Cathedral, an enormous window of c.1430 in the Perpendicular Gothic style, of nine lights and four tiers. This window complemented, at the other end of the building, one of the largest ancient windows in the world; the east window (which is as big as a tennis court) fortunately had retained much of its 14th-century glass, comprising many tiers of figures.

Wailes' west window at Gloucester is a stupendous achievement, and not just because of the technicalities involved in glazing such a vast area. It makes no attempt to imitate the style or content of the east window. The content of the west window, like that of so many other commissions, was probably stipulated by a committee. Because the window was so large there was room for a large number of narratives and many figures.

The window comprises nine vertical sections called lights which are divided by mullions into three lots of three. The window rises in three stages, the first and the third being approximately half as tall as the middle one, the whole being surmounted by many smaller vertical tracery lights, which Wailes predictably filled with singing angels neatly arranged in robes of violet, bright red and arsenic green.

Wailes' design divides the window's main part into four rather than three stages, each containing three complex narrative scenes which are made successfully to span three lights. The central section which shows the Nativity of Christ with the Baptism of Christ in the Jordan by John the Baptist (one below the other) is a particularly successful composition, considering that it contains two significant narrative incidents which visually harmonise, yet remain discrete scenes. While each of the twelve individual pictures works as a unit, the visual composition of the whole window is skilfully arranged so as to present as an integrated work of art. This has been achieved by the skilled placement of the 116 figures and the equally skilful disposition of colour.

Churches containing stained glass by William Wailes

 

England
 St. Andrew's Church, Bradfield, Berkshire
 St. Mary's Church, Thatcham, Berkshire
 Church of St. Peter and St. Paul, Great Missenden, Buckinghamshire
 St. Helen Witton's Church, Northwich, Cheshire
 Church of St. Mary the Virgin, Ambleside, Cumbria
 All Saints' Church, Huntsham, Devon
 St. John the Evangelist's Church, Birtley, County Durham
 St Helen's Church, Low Fell, County Durham
 Holy Trinity Church, Sunderland, County Durham
 Gloucester Cathedral, Gloucester, Gloucestershire
 St. Edward's Church, Stow on the Wold, Gloucestershire
 St. Matthias' Church, Richmond, Greater London
 St. George's Cathedral, Southwark, Greater London
 St. Mark's Church, St John's Wood, Greater London
 All Saints' Church, Hursley, Hampshire
 St. Mary's Church, Kingsclere, Hampshire
 St. George's Church, Benenden, Kent
 St. Mary's Church, Chilham, Kent
 St. Lawrence's Church, Waltham, Kent
 St. Peter's Church, Crostwick, Norfolk
 St. Edmund's Church, Emneth, Norfolk
 Hexham Abbey, Hexham, Northumberland
 St. Mary's Church, Clipsham, Rutland
 St. James the Less, Fradswell, Staffordshire
 St. Editha's Church, Tamworth, Staffordshire
 St. Martin's Church, Dorking, Surrey
 St. John's Church, Piddinghoe, East Sussex
 Chichester Cathedral, Chichester, West Sussex
 St. Botolph's Church, Farnborough, Warwickshire
 St. Boniface's Church, Bonchurch, Isle of Wight
 St. James' Church, Devizes, Wiltshire
 Church of St. Anne, Catterick, North Yorkshire
 Bridlington Priory, Bridlington, East Yorkshire
 Church of St. Thomas, Thurstonland, West Yorkshire

Scotland
 Cathedral of the Isles, Millport, Ayrshire

Australia
 Christ Church St Laurence, Sydney, New South Wales

India
 Afghan Church, Mumbai, Maharashtra

United States
 First Presbyterian Church, Philadelphia, Pennsylvania

See also

Other early 19th century firms
 Thomas Willement
 William Warrington
 Charles Edmund Clutterbuck
 Hardman & Co.
 Augustus Welby Pugin

Context
 Stained glass
 Stained glass - British glass, 1811-1918
 Victorian Era
 Gothic Revival
 Poor Man's Bible

References

 Painton Cowen, A Guide to Stained Glass in Britain, 1985, Michael Joseph, 
 Elizabeth Morris, Stained and Decorative Glass, Doubleday, 
 Sarah Brown, Stained Glass- an Illustrated History, Bracken Books, 
 Simon Jenkins, England's Thousand Best Churches, Allen Lane, the Penguin Press, 
 John Harvey, English Cathedrals, Batsford, 1961, ISBN unknown
 Robert Eberhard, Church Stained Glass Windows,  
 Cliff and Monica Robinson, Buckinghamshire Stained Glass, 
 Victorian Wolverhampton, a town through its buildings, 

English stained glass artists and manufacturers
1808 births
1881 deaths
Businesspeople from Newcastle upon Tyne